The 2019 Icelandic Cup, also known as Mjólkurbikarinn for sponsorship reasons, was the 60th edition of the Icelandic national football cup. The 2019 Icelandic Cup final was played on 14 September at Laugardalsvöllur. The 2019 winners and current holders of the cup are Víkingur after beating FH 1–0 in the final.

Calendar
Below are the dates for each round as given by the official schedule:

First round

Second round

Round of 32

Round of 16

Quarter-finals

Semi-finals

Final

Top goalscorers

References

External links

2019 in Icelandic football
2019 domestic association football cups
Icelandic Men's Football Cup